Grundt is a surname. Notable people with the surname include:

Arne Ludvig Grundt Ileby (1913–1999), Norwegian footballer
Julian Grundt (born 1988), German footballer
Ken Grundt (born 1969), American baseball pitcher
Lars Otto Roll Grundt (1843–1907), Norwegian civil servant and politician
Michael Grundt Spang (1931–2003), Norwegian journalist, crime reporter and crime fiction writer

See also 
Grund (disambiguation)
Grunt (disambiguation)